Brian Scott Herzlinger (born February 19, 1976,  Brooklyn, New York) is an American film director who directed and starred in My Date with Drew, a documentary released in 2005. Herzlinger graduated from Ithaca College (NY) with a film degree in 1997.

Early years
Herzlinger grew up in Evesham Township, New Jersey, where he attended Cherokee High School, graduating in 1994 as the prom king.

In 1997, he graduated from Ithaca College with a BS in Cinema & Photography.  He had written and directed a short, student film called The Film Contest shot on 16mm film. After moving to Los Angeles, Herzlinger directed more short films, including Malicious Intent. He worked at DreamWorks and MGM and also as a Production Assistant on several commercials and music videos.  Afterwards, he worked for two years as a Producer's P.A. on the CBS medical drama Chicago Hope, and worked his way up to Executive Producer Bill D'Elia's assistant on the David E. Kelley landmark series Ally McBeal. After his first feature My Date With Drew, Herzlinger began a three-year stint as an on-air special correspondent for The Tonight Show with Jay Leno. Simultaneously, he directed the romantic comedy Baby on Board, starring Heather Graham, Jerry O'Connell, John Corbett and Lara Flynn Boyle which hit theatres nationwide in 2009.

Herzlinger's love for film began at a young age with his first viewing of the film E.T.: The Extra-Terrestrial, said the director in an interview for The Film That Changed My Life by Robert K. Elder.

I think it gave us permission to believe, and I’ll tell you right now, one of my biggest things as a person, as a filmmaker, is being able to believe. If I didn’t have that and didn’t have that ability, I would have failed at this business.

Recent years

Herzlinger has multiple film and television projects in the works. He currently lives in Malibu, California and works as a film director and writer.

My Date with Drew was Brian Herzlinger's first feature film as a director/producer. He starred in the $1,100 film, which was rated the 4th most profitable film of all time. The film also took the film festival circuit by storm, earning the following accolades: 

HBO Comedy Arts Film Festival - Audience Award for Best Feature Film; Best Documentary at the Vail Film Festival; Best Feature Film at the 
Gen Art Film Festival (NY); and the Sonoma Valley Film Festival's Best Feature Film, Best First Time Feature, and the Grand Jury Prize for Film Excellence.

Between 2005 and 2009, Herzlinger served as a regular On-Air Correspondent for The Tonight Show with Jay Leno, starring in over 26 episodes for the number one-rated late night program. 

He produced and hosted his own segment of TV's Extra, as well as serving as an on-air correspondent for Jerry Zucker’s (Naked Gun, Airplane!) internet and television entity National Banana. 

In 2008, Herzlinger directed the feature film Baby on Board, a $5 million romantic comedy that hit theatres nationwide in Spring 2009 to positive critical response.

In 2010, Summit Entertainment hired Black and Herzlinger to re-write their $50 million action comedy Mental.
In 2011, Herzlinger directed the feature Brother White (starring Bruce Davison and Ray Wise) as well as the television pilot for B&B Media's Today’s Tiaras.

In 2012, Herzlinger served as host for Laugh Factor, a CW pilot for the Wayans Brothers, described as The Voice for stand-up comedy. Also in 2012, Herzlinger the comedy musical How Sweet It Is (starring Paul Sorvino and Joe Piscopo), which was co-written by Jay Black & Herzlinger, and released in select theatres nationwide on May 10, 2013. That same year, he directed the family holiday film Christmas Angel (starring Kevin Sorbo and Della Reese), which became the highest-rated TV movie of 2012 for the GMC network with over 3 million viewers.

In 2013, he directed the feature film Finding Normal. He produced, directed, and co-wrote the TV pilot Paulie (starring Paul Sorvino and Janeane Garofalo). Also in 2013, Black & Herzlinger re-wrote Moms Night Out, a Sony Pictures film budgeted at $5 million, starring Patricia Heaton. Black and Herzlinger completed writing duties on the horror film The Death House, (slated for production in 2015). 

In 2014, Herzlinger and Black wrote the cancer drama Meet My Valentine. He directed the film for Marvista Entertainment which was released on Valentine's Day 2015, and is currently on Netflix. In 2015, the duo wrote the action film, The Bus Driver, which Herzlinger also directed. That year, he also directed the feature drama The Perfect Daughter starring Parker Stevenson and Meredith Salenger. He co-wrote and directed the Christmas film Love Always, Santa and directed the series pilot Confessions of a Hollywood Bartender.

In 2016, Herzlinger directed the feature romantic comedy Love's Last Resort, which turned out to be the late Alan Thicke's last film; Hush Little Baby, a thriller starring Erin Cahill; and the Pureflix original series pilot Hitting The Breaks.  

In 2017, Herzlinger directed the romantic drama Runaway Romance starring Tatum O'Neal. 
In 2019, he directed his second documentary, My Truth: The Rape of 2 Coreys. The film explores actor Corey Feldman's allegations sexual abuse as a child by prominent Hollywood figures.

Filmography

References

External links

My Date With Drew production information

Living people
Cherokee High School (New Jersey) alumni
Film directors from New Jersey

Ithaca College alumni
People from Evesham Township, New Jersey
1976 births
Place of birth missing (living people)